Following is a list of senators of French Africa, people who have represented the colonies in French Equatorial Africa during the French Fourth Republic.
French Equatorial Africa was the federation of French colonial possessions in Equatorial Africa, extending northwards from the Congo River into the Sahel, and comprising what are today the countries of Chad, the Central African Republic, Cameroon, the Republic of the Congo, and Gabon.

Cameroons

Senators for the French Cameroons under the French Fourth Republic were:

French Cameroun gained independence from France on 1 January 1960 and became the Republic of Cameroon.

Chad

Senators for Chad under the French Fourth Republic were: 

Chad became an independent country on 11 August 1960.

French Congo
 
Senators for the French Congo under the French Fourth Republic were:

The Republic of the Congo gained full independence from France on 15 August 1960.

Gabon
 
Senators for Gabon under the French Fourth Republic were:

Gabon became an independent country on 17 August 1960.

Ubangi-Shari

Senators for Ubangi-Shari under the French Fourth Republic were:

Ubangi-Shari was renamed the Central African Republic (CAR) on 1 December 1958 and became fully independent on 13 August 1960.

References

Sources

 
Lists of members of the Senate (France) by department